Alex James Jones (born 28 September 1993) is a Welsh rugby league footballer who played in the 2010s. He has played at club level for the South Wales Scorpions and was part of the 2012 Tri Nations Wales squad.

Background
He is from the Church Village, Rhondda, Wales.

References

External links
Statistics at loverugbyleague.com

1993 births
Living people
People from Church Village
Rugby league players from Rhondda Cynon Taf
South Wales Scorpions players
Welsh rugby league players